The Love Nest is a 1923 American short comedy silent film written and directed by and starring Buster Keaton.

Plot
In order to escape from his life and his lost love, Keaton sets off on his small boat, Cupid, but runs into the whaling ship, The Love Nest.  The whaler's merciless captain throws crew members overboard for even the slightest offense.

After his steward accidentally pours hot tea over the captain's hand, the captain tosses him overboard and replaces him with Keaton. Despite a series of mishaps, Keaton manages to avoid the fate of other crewmen.

But Keaton desires to escape, and chops a hole in the hull to sink the boat. He escapes in a lifeboat with no idea where land is.

He docks at the rear of a platform he is unaware is a target bullseye for naval gunnery practice. The Navy scores a direct hit and Keaton is seen hurtled skyward; angel-wing style.

Keaton then wakes up in his own boat; which had never left the dock. The whole thing had been a dream.

Cast
 Buster Keaton - Buster Keaton
 Joe Roberts - Captain of the Whaler
 Virginia Fox - The Girl

See also
 List of American films of 1923
 Buster Keaton filmography
 List of United States comedy films
 1923 in film

External links
 
 
 
 The Love Nest at the International Buster Keaton Society

1923 films
1923 comedy films
American silent short films
American black-and-white films
Films about whaling
Films directed by Buster Keaton
Films directed by Edward F. Cline
Silent American comedy films
Films produced by Joseph M. Schenck
Films with screenplays by Buster Keaton
1923 short films
American comedy short films
1920s American films
Silent adventure films